Paul van Rietvelde (born 7 August 1991) is a Scottish badminton player. Paul competed at the 2010 Commonwealth Games in New Delhi, India and 2014 Commonwealth Games in Glasgow, Scotland.

Achievements

BWF International Challenge/Series (3 titles, 2 runners-up) 
Men's doubles

  BWF International Challenge tournament
  BWF International Series tournament
  BWF Future Series tournament

References

External links 

 

1991 births
Living people
Sportspeople from Edinburgh
Scottish male badminton players
Commonwealth Games competitors for Scotland
Badminton players at the 2010 Commonwealth Games
Badminton players at the 2014 Commonwealth Games
Scottish people of Dutch descent